Leninskoye is a rural locality (a (selo) and the administrative center of  Leninsky District of the Jewish Autonomous Oblast, Russia. Population:

References

Rural localities in the Jewish Autonomous Oblast